Paul Chemla (born January 2, 1944) is a famous French bridge player.

Chemla was born in Tunis.  He studied at the École Normale Supérieure in Paris where he took up playing bridge. His wins include three European Pairs Championships (1976 with Michel Lebel, 1985 with Michel Perron, and 1999 with Alain Lévy), two World Team Olympiads (1980 and 1992), and the 1997 Bermuda Bowl. Chemla is noted for his girth and his large cigars.

Bridge accomplishments

Awards
 IBPA Personality of the Year 1998

Wins
 Bermuda Bowl (1) 1997
 World Open Team Olympiad (2) 1980, 1992
 Transnational Mixed Teams (1) 2004
 European Championships (6)
 Open Pairs (3) 1976, 1985, 1999
 Mixed Teams (3) 1990, 1996, 1998
 Other notable wins:
 Forbo-Krommenie Nations Cup (1) 1998
 Yeh Bros Cup Open Teams (1) 2006
 Sunday Times Invitational Pairs (1) 1991
 Generali World Masters Individual (1) 1998

Runners-up
 World Team Olympiad (1) 1984
 Transnational Mixed Teams (1) 2000
 European Open Bridge Championships (1)
 Open Teams (1) 2003
 European Championships (3)
 Open Teams (1) 1995
 Mixed Pairs (1) 1998
 Senior Teams (1) 1999
 Other notable 2nd places:
 Staten Bank World Top Invitational Pairs (1) 1988
 Cavendish Invitational Pairs (1) 1982

External links
 
 

1944 births
French contract bridge players
Bermuda Bowl players
Living people
People from Tunis